The 2008 United States presidential election in Connecticut took place on November 4, 2008, and was part of the 2008 United States presidential election. Voters chose seven representatives, or electors to the Electoral College, who voted for president and vice president.

Connecticut was won by Democratic nominee Barack Obama with a 22.4% margin of victory.  Connecticut was one of the six states that had every county—including traditionally Republican Litchfield County—go for Obama, the others being Hawaii, Massachusetts, New Hampshire, Rhode Island, and Vermont. Connecticut has not voted for a Republican presidential nominee since 1988 when the state was carried by George H.W. Bush over Michael Dukakis.

As of 2020, this was the most recent presidential election in which the Democratic nominee carried the towns of Barkhamsted, Colebrook, New Hartford, Plymouth, Preston, Scotland, Thompson, Torrington, and Winchester. This is also the only time since 1916 that the town of Warren voted Democratic. , this is the last election in which Litchfield County voted for the Democratic candidate, also making it the last time any presidential candidate has won every single county in the state.

Primaries
 2008 Connecticut Democratic presidential primary
 2008 Connecticut Republican presidential primary

Campaign

Predictions 
There were 16 news organizations who made state-by-state predictions of the election. Here are their last predictions before election day:

Polling

Barack Obama won every single poll taken in the state, and every one of them by a double-digit margin of victory.

Fundraising
John McCain raised a total of $3,966,985. Barack Obama raised $9,727,617.

Advertising and visits
Obama spent $730,335 while McCain spent nothing on the state. Neither campaign visited the state.

Analysis
Connecticut is a part of New England, an area of the country that has in recent decades become a Democratic stronghold. The state went Republican in most of the elections from 1948 to 1988, the exceptions being the three in the 1960s.  However, following Bill Clinton's narrow victory in the state in 1992, it has not been seriously contested by Republicans since.  McCain ceded the state to Obama early on, despite the endorsement of the state's incumbent Senator Joe Lieberman, a Democrat-turned-Independent who still caucused with the Democrats but backed McCain for president in 2008.

In 2006, Democrats knocked off two incumbent Republicans and picked up two U.S. House seats in CT-02 and CT-05 (Joe Courtney and Chris Murphy, respectively). Although then-Governor M. Jodi Rell and Lieutenant Governor Michael Fedele were both moderate Republicans, all other statewide offices were held by Democrats. Democrats also enjoyed a supermajority status in both chambers of the Connecticut state legislature.

In 2008, Democrat Jim Himes defeated incumbent Republican Christopher Shays, who was at the time the only Republican member of the U.S. House from New England, for the U.S. House seat in Connecticut's 4th congressional district.  This was largely because Obama carried the district with a staggering 60% of the vote—one of his best performances in a Republican-held district.  Shays' defeat meant that for the first time in almost 150 years, there were no Republican Representatives from New England.  In no other part of the country is a major political party completely shut out. At the state level, Democrats picked up 6 seats in the Connecticut House of Representatives and 1 seat in the Connecticut Senate.

Results

By county

Counties that flipped from Republican to Democratic
 Litchfield (largest borough: Litchfield)

By congressional district
Barack Obama carried all 5  of Connecticut’s congressional districts.

Electors

Technically the voters of Connecticut cast their ballots for electors: representatives to the Electoral College. Connecticut is allocated 7 electors because it has 5 congressional districts and 2 senators. All candidates who appear on the ballot or qualify to receive write-in votes must submit a list of 7 electors, who pledge to vote for their candidate and his or her running mate. Whoever wins the majority of votes in the state is awarded all sevenelectoral votes. Their chosen electors then vote for president and vice president. Although electors are pledged to their candidate and running mate, they are not obligated to vote for them. An elector who votes for someone other than his or her candidate is known as a faithless elector.

The electors of each state and the District of Columbia met on December 15, 2008, to cast their votes for president and vice president. The Electoral College itself never meets as one body. Instead the electors from each state and the District of Columbia met in their respective capitols.

The following were the members of the Electoral College from the state. All 7 were pledged to Barack Obama and Joe Biden:
Shirley Steinmetz
Nicholas Paindiris
Andrea Jackson Brooks
Jim Ezzes
Lorraine McQueen
Deborah McFadden
Ken Delacruz

See also
 United States presidential elections in Connecticut

References

Connecticut
2008
2008 Connecticut elections